István Miklósy (22 August 1857 – 29 October 1937) was a Hungarian Greek Catholic hierarch. He was the first eparchial bishop of the Hungarian Greek Catholic Eparchy of Hajdúdorog from 1913 to 1937.

Born in Rakovec nad Ondavou, Austria-Hungary (present day – Slovakia) in 1857, he was ordained a priest on 17 April 1884. He was appointed the Bishop by the Holy See on 23 June 1913. He was consecrated to the Episcopate on 5 October 1913. The principal consecrator was Bishop Julije Drohobeczky, and the principal co-consecrators were Bishop Augustín Fischer-Colbrie and Bishop József Lányi de Késmark.

He died in Nyíregyháza on 29 October 1937.

See also

References 

1857 births
1937 deaths
20th-century Eastern Catholic bishops
Hungarian Eastern Catholics
Hungarian bishops
People from Michalovce District
Bishops of the Hungarian Greek Catholic Church